Walter Robert Hadwen  (3 August 1854 – 27 December 1932) was an English general practitioner, pharmaceutical chemist and writer. He was president of the British Union for the Abolition of Vivisection (BUAV) and an anti-vaccination campaigner, known for his denial of the germ theory of disease.

Biography
Walter Robert Hadwen was born in Woolwich on 3 August 1854. He began his career as a pharmacist in Clapham then Somerset, then subsequently trained as a doctor at Bristol University. After qualifying, he moved to Gloucester in 1896. Hadwen was recruited as a member of the British Union for the Abolition of Vivisection by its founder and then president Frances Power Cobbe who hired a private investigator to assess his credentials (he was a vegetarian and total abstainer, had a reputation as a "firebrand" orator and was held in "high local esteem"). She subsequently selected him as her successor.

He later became a member of the Plymouth Brethren and married Alice Harral in 1878; they had three children. Hadwen was a frequent speaker for the National Anti-Vaccination League. He was also a member of the London Association for the Prevention of Premature Burial (founded in 1896). Hadwen stated that the "modern germ theory is all bosh".

Hadwen was active in general practice until he died from a severe heart attack in 1932, age 78. In his honour the Dr Hadwen Trust was founded in 1970 to fund exclusive non-animal techniques to replace animal experiments.

Vegetarianism

Hadwen became a vegetarian in his early twenties when taking a bet from a fellow student that he could live six months without eating meat. His bet was successful and he stated that "For my part I am quite satisfied with my trial of vegetarianism, and it would take more than mortal power to persuade me once again to make my stomach a graveyard for the purpose of burying dead bodies in."

Manslaughter trial 

In 1924, having applied his rejection of the germ theory of disease, and his refusal to use diphtheria anti-serum produced by inoculation of animals to the treatment of Nellie Burnham, a young girl, she died and he was tried for manslaughter by criminal medical negligence.  He was acquitted of all charges.

Selected publications

Is Flesh-Eating Harmful?, 1895
The Case Against Vaccination, 1896
Smallpox at Gloucester: A Reply to Dr. Coupland’s Report, 1902. Reprinted from "The Reformer," National Anti-Vaccination League: Gloucester.
Vivisection: Its Follies and Cruelties, 1905
A Debate on Should Vivisection be Abolished?, 1907
A Correspondence in "The Daily mail" Between Sir Victor Horsley and Walter R. Hadwen, on Vivisection (1908)
A Debate on Is Vivisection Immoral, Cruel, Useless and Unscientific? (1908)
Dr. Walter Robert Hadwen's Works, 1908
A Vivisection Controversy, 1911
Experiments on Living Animals, Useless and Cruel, 1914
The Difficulties of Dr. Deguerre, 1926

See also

Vaccine hesitancy

References

Further reading

Who Was Dr Hadwen Biography at Dr Hadwen Trust.
Walter Hadwen Biography by Walter Hawkins.
Bodily Matters: The Anti-Vaccination Movement in England, 1853-1907, Nadja Durbach, 2005, Duke University Press, 
Hadwen of Gloucester: Man, Medico, Martyr, by Beatrice E. Kidd and M. Edith Richards, 1933, John Murray, London.
Obituary, The Times, Saturday, 25 February 1933 John Murray, London, 1933.

1854 births
1932 deaths
19th-century English male writers
20th-century English male writers
19th-century English medical doctors
20th-century English medical doctors
Alumni of the University of Bristol
Anti-vivisectionists
British anti-vaccination activists
British Plymouth Brethren
British vegetarianism activists
English male non-fiction writers
English medical writers
Germ theory denialists
People acquitted of manslaughter
People from Woolwich
Public orators